Ivanovskaya Square is the largest Kremlin square. Its name comes from the Ivan the Great Bell Tower.

In the 16th and 17th centuries, many government bodies were situated in the Ivanovskaya Square. It was the site of the Prikazy, the equivalent of today's Ministries. Yamskoi Prikaz, one of the offices, handled the delivery of private letters. Thus, it became the first postal address in Moscow. Court services and chanceries of various departments were also situated here.  

At the end of the 1920s and early 1930s, the square was enlarged after the demolition of the Lesser Nicholas Palace and the Ascension Convent. 

Today, the square is cobbled like most of the territory of the Kremlin. It offers a view of one of the three corners of the Kremlin Senate.

Gallery

References 
 
 

Squares in Moscow
Moscow Kremlin